Marked "Personal" (1893) is a detective novel by American author Anna Katharine Green.

Synopsis
On the evening of July 13, 1863, two men from Washington and Boston, respectively, leave their homes after showing signs of agitation and distress throughout the day. That morning, each one had received a mysterious letter marked 'personal', which they both quickly destroyed.

References

1893 American novels
American detective novels